Ip Kwok Kan is a Hongkonger footballer who plays as a defender. She has been a member of the Hong Kong women's national team.

International career 
Ip Kwok Kan capped for Hong Kong at senior level during three AFC Women's Asian Cup qualifications (2008, 2010 and 2014) and the 2012 AFC Women's Olympic Qualifying Tournament.

See also 
 List of Hong Kong women's international footballers

References

External links

Living people
Hong Kong women's footballers
Women's association football defenders
Hong Kong women's international footballers
Year of birth missing (living people)